Pottsgrove School District is a school district headquartered in Lower Pottsgrove Township, Pennsylvania, United States. The district serves Lower Pottsgrove Township, Upper Pottsgrove Township, and West Pottsgrove Township.

Schools

 West Pottsgrove Elementary School (K-2) is in West Pottsgrove Township
 Ringing Rocks Elementary School (K-2) is in Lower Pottsgrove Township
 Lower Pottsgrove Elementary School (3-5) is in Lower Pottsgrove Township
 Pottsgrove Middle School (6-8) is in Upper Pottsgrove Township
 Pottsgrove High School (9-12) is in Lower Pottsgrove Township.

In February 2012 the district passed a vote to rearrange the elementary schools from three K-5 schools into two K-2 schools and one 3-5 school.

References

External links

 

School districts in Montgomery County, Pennsylvania